Rodney A. Smolla, is an American author, First Amendment scholar and lawyer. He is currently the president of the Vermont Law School, and former dean of the Widener University Delaware Law School until spring 2022. He was the 11th president of Furman University. In 2015, it was announced that on 1 July of that year, Smolla would become the dean of the newly separate Delaware Law School of Widener University.

Smolla went to Yale University as an undergraduate and also to Duke University Law School, where he finished first in his class. After his graduation, Smolla served as a clerk for Charles Clark, a judge on the Fifth Circuit Court of Appeals, in 1978–1979.

Smolla began his academic career at the DePaul University College of Law in 1980. After teaching at the University of Illinois College of Law, the University of Arkansas School of Law, and the University of Denver College of Law, he served as a professor at William & Mary Law School, where he was also director of the Institute of Bill of Rights Law. In 2003, he was named Dean of the University of Richmond School of Law. Smolla became Dean of Washington and Lee University School of Law on 1 July 2007, where he established their innovative third-year law program. He was a visiting professor at Duke University Law School and the University of Melbourne Law School. In 2002, Smolla argued Virginia v. Black before the Supreme Court of the United States. The case revolved around the constitutionality of Virginia's cross burning statute. In 2017, in the aftermath of the violent “Unite the Right” rally in Charlottesville, Virginia, Smolla was appointed by Gov. Terry McAuliffe to serve as a special advisor on First Amendment issues to the Governor’s Task Force on Public Safety, Preparedness and Response to Civil Unrest.

Smolla serves on the board of directors of the Media General Corporation. He has served on numerous other civic, community, and professional boards.

Smolla was the director of the Annenberg Washington Program Libel Reform Project, and author of the Annenberg Libel Reform Report that emerged from the blue ribbon task force on that project. He has also testified before the Senate Judiciary Committee on the topic of the reporter's privilege.

He is the author of several books on the law and First Amendment issues, including Jerry Falwell v. Larry Flynt: The First Amendment on Trial, and Deliberate Intent: A Lawyer Tells the True Story of Murder by the Book. Deliberate Intent described his involvement as attorney for the plaintiffs in the notorious Hit Man book case. Smolla successfully represented the families of three murder victims in a suit against the publisher of a murder instruction manual used by a hit man for guidance to carry out the murders. The book was made into a television movie by Fox and the FX Cable Network, and actor Timothy Hutton portrayed Smolla. His book Free Speech in an Open Society won the William O. Douglas Prize. He edited A Year in the Life of the Supreme Court, which won the ABA Silver Gavel Award.

Smolla has also written extensively for the legal academic world, including the legal treatise Smolla and Nimmer on Freedom of Speech (Thomson Reuters West, 3 volumes, 1996); Federal Civil Rights Acts (West Group, 2 volumes, 1994); and Law of Defamation (Thomson Reuters West 2nd Edition 2000, 2 volumes); and Law of Lawyer Advertising (2 volumes, Thomson Reuters West 2006). He is also the author of a case book on First Amendment law, The First Amendment: Freedom of Expression, Regulation of Mass Media, Freedom of Religion (Carolina Academic Press 1999), and the co-author of a constitutional law case book, Constitutional Law: Structure and Rights in Our Federal System with Professor William Banks, 6th Edition, Lexis Nexis 2010.

References

External links
 Rodney A. Smolla Named Dean of the Washington and Lee School of Law
 Smolla at Slate Magazine
 

Year of birth missing (living people)
Living people
American legal scholars
Deans of law schools in the United States
Yale University alumni
Duke University School of Law alumni
DePaul University faculty
University of Illinois faculty
University of Arkansas faculty
University of Denver faculty
Place of birth missing (living people)
Washington and Lee University School of Law faculty
First Amendment scholars